Dobarz  is a village in the administrative district of Gmina Trzcianne, within Mońki County, Podlaskie Voivodeship, in north-eastern Poland.

The village has a population of 30.

References

Dobarz